Bert Scheirlinckx (born 1 November 1974) is a Belgian professional road bicycle racer, who is a member of the cycling team Geofco-Ville d'Alger.

Palmarès

2002
 3rd Overall, Tour of Japan
 1st, Stage 2, Tour of Japan

'2003
 4th, Rund um Köln

2004
 3rd, Tro-Bro Léon
 3rd, Tour du Finistère
 3rd, Druivenkoers Overijse

2006
 1st, Stadsprijs Geraardsbergen
 2nd, Polynormande
 3rd, Hel van het Mergelland

2009
 3rd, Flèche flamande
 3rd, Druivenkoers Overijse

2010
 3rd, Eschborn-Frankfurt City Loop

2011
 2nd, Classic Loire Atlantique
 1st, Grand Prix Pino Cerami
 1st, Internationale Wielertrofee Jong Maar Moedig

External links
 
 Palmares on Cycling Base
 

1974 births
Living people
People from Zottegem
Belgian male cyclists
Cyclists from East Flanders